Sándor Pintér (born 3 July 1948) is a Hungarian politician and former top police officer. He served as Minister of the Interior from 1998 to 2002 and since 2010, in Viktor Orbán's cabinets.

Biography
Pintér was born and raised in Budapest. He graduated from the Police Officer College at Budapest in 1978. He worked in the criminal-investigation divisions of the national, Budapest and Pest County Police Departments between 1978 and 1991. He received degree at Law and Political Sciences in Eötvös Loránd University in 1986 at age of 38.

Before his entry into the political arena after retirement, he worked as a police officer. After entering the police service in 1972 and rising through the ranks, he reached top positions in the Hungarian police, such as Chief of the Budapest police in 1991, and then Chief of the National Police between 1991 and 1996.

Political career
He was a member of the Hungarian Socialist Workers' Party (MSZMP) before the transition to democracy in Hungary (1990).

Allegedly, between 1993 and 1996, Dietmar Clodo gave large sums of money from Semion Mogilevich to numerous Hungarian politicians including Pinter in 1996/1997.

Sándor Pintér served as Minister of the Interior in the first cabinet of Viktor Orbán from 1998 to 2002. He worked as businessman between two periods as Minister of the Interior, operating security, economic-consultation and travel companies.

He was appointed Minister of the Interior again in 2010. His most prominent tasks are the suppression of the delinquency and the restoration of the police's efficiency. The secret services' single part was also at his disposal until 2022. Pintér said that they had reviewed the changes done at the police in 2010, and also had set the tasks to be accomplished during the year of 2011 in order to improve the police work to achieve a better state of public order and security in the country. As Minister of the Interior, he was superior of the Constitution Protection Office Director General, domestic criminal-investigative and counterintelligence agency, Counter Terrorism Centre Director General, special weapons and tactics, hostage rescue agency, National Protective Service Director General, organization completing tasks such as: crime prevention and detection, lifestyle monitoring, integrity testing and Special Service for National Security Director General, agency – provider of the technical background needed to clandestine collection of information.

Pintér served as interior minister in the second, third, fourth and fifth Orbán governments. After the 2022 parliamentary election, secret services transferred to the portfolio of the Prime Minister's Cabinet Office headed by Antal Rogán, while the Ministry of the Interior headed by Sándor Pintér received the health and education portfolio.

Personal life
He is married. His wife is Ildikó Pintérné Eötvös and has three daughters, Hajnalka, Csillag and Ildikó.

Notes

References

Pintér Sándor a VoksCentrumon

1948 births
Living people
Politicians from Budapest
Hungarian police officers
Hungarian Interior Ministers
Members of the Fourth Orbán Government
Members of the Hungarian Socialist Workers' Party
Members of the fifth Orbán government